Ateuchus is a genus of some 70 species of New World scarab beetles (Scarabaeidae) in the subfamily Scarabaeinae.

Description
Species range in shape from oval to very convex. The scutellum is concealed, the elytra have eight striae, and the clypeus is bidentate.

Species
The list is according to the Catalogue of Life.

Ateuchus aeneomicans
Ateuchus alipioi
Ateuchus alutacius
Ateuchus ambiguus 
Ateuchus apicatus 
Ateuchus asperatus 
Ateuchus balthasari 
Ateuchus benitojuarezi 
Ateuchus bordoni 
Ateuchus breve 
Ateuchus calcaratus 
Ateuchus candezei 
Ateuchus carbonarius 
Ateuchus carcavalloi 
Ateuchus carolinae 
Ateuchus cereus
Ateuchus cernyi
Ateuchus chrysopyge
Ateuchus colossus
Ateuchus columbianus
Ateuchus confusus
Ateuchus connexus
Ateuchus contractus
Ateuchus cujuchi
Ateuchus earthorus
Ateuchus ecuadorensis
Ateuchus euchalceus
Ateuchus femoratus
Ateuchus fetteri
Ateuchus floridensis
Ateuchus freudei
Ateuchus frontale
Ateuchus fuscipes
Ateuchus fuscorubrus
Ateuchus gershensoni
Ateuchus ginae
Ateuchus globulus
Ateuchus granigerus
Ateuchus guatemalensis
Ateuchus halffteri
Ateuchus hamatus
Ateuchus hendrichsi
Ateuchus histeroides
Ateuchus histrio
Ateuchus hoplopygus
Ateuchus hornai
Ateuchus howdeni
Ateuchus hypocrita
Ateuchus illaesus
Ateuchus irinus
Ateuchus klugi
Ateuchus laetitiae
Ateuchus laevicolle
Ateuchus laterale
Ateuchus latus
Ateuchus lecontei
Ateuchus loricatus
Ateuchus luciae
Ateuchus murrayi
Ateuchus mutilatus
Ateuchus myrmecophilus
Ateuchus nitidulus
Ateuchus oblongus
Ateuchus opacipennis
Ateuchus ovale
Ateuchus parvus
Ateuchus pauki
Ateuchus pauperatus
Ateuchus perezvelai
Ateuchus perpusillus
Ateuchus persplendens
Ateuchus peruanus
Ateuchus procerus
Ateuchus pruneus
Ateuchus puncticolle
Ateuchus pygidialis
Ateuchus rispolii
Ateuchus robustus
Ateuchus rodriguezi
Ateuchus romani
Ateuchus scatimoides
Ateuchus semicribratus
Ateuchus setulosus
Ateuchus simplex
Ateuchus solisi
Ateuchus squalidus
Ateuchus steinbachi
Ateuchus striatulus
Ateuchus subquadratus
Ateuchus substriatus
Ateuchus tenebrosus
Ateuchus texanus
Ateuchus tridenticeps
Ateuchus viduus
Ateuchus vigilans
Ateuchus viridimicans
Ateuchus vividus
Ateuchus zoebischi

References

Scarabaeinae